Sulaiman Tejan-Jalloh is a Sierra Leonean politician and ambassador.
From 1996 to 1997 under President Ahmed Tejan Kabbah's government-in-exile during the Sierra Leone Civil War, he served as Minister of Transport and Communications.
From  to 2003, Tejan-Jalloh was Sierra Leone's High Commissioner to the United Kingdom.

References

Year of birth missing (living people)
Living people
Sierra Leonean diplomats
High Commissioners of Sierra Leone to the United Kingdom
Government ministers of Sierra Leone
Ambassadors of Sierra Leone to the United States